Ivory Coast  competed at the 2016 Summer Paralympics in Rio de Janeiro, Brazil, from 7 September to 18 September 2016.

Disability classifications 

Every participant at the Paralympics has their disability grouped into one of five disability categories; amputation, the condition may be congenital or sustained through injury or illness; cerebral palsy; wheelchair athletes, there is often overlap between this and other categories; visual impairment, including blindness; Les autres, any physical disability that does not fall strictly under one of the other categories, for example dwarfism or multiple sclerosis. Each Paralympic sport then has its own classifications, dependent upon the specific physical demands of competition. Events are given a code, made of numbers and letters, describing the type of event and classification of the athletes competing. Some sports, such as athletics, divide athletes by both the category and severity of their disabilities, other sports, for example swimming, group competitors from different categories together, the only separation being based on the severity of the disability.

Delegation 
The country was represented by 5 Paralympians, 3 men and 2 women, competing in two sport, athletics and powerlifting.  Both competed in athletics.

Medallists
The Ivory Coast finished eighth overall among African countries on the gold medal table, with 1 silver medal.

Athletics

Men's Track

Men's Field

Women's Track

Women's Field

Powerlifting
38-year-old Alidou Diamoutene represented the Ivory Coast at the Paralympics. He previously competed at the 2004, 2008 and 2012 Paralympics.   His best finish was fifth. Diamoutene  also competed at the 2006, 2010 and 2014 IPC Powerlifting World Championships, with a best finish of fifth in the -48 kg class in 2006. Nicknamed The Tiger, he is coached by Roger Angoua and Emile N'goran.

See also 
Ivory Coast at the 2016 Summer Olympics

References 

Nations at the 2016 Summer Paralympics
2016
2016 in Ivorian sport